This is a list of all the United States Supreme Court cases from volume 320 of the United States Reports:

External links

1944 in United States case law
1943 in United States case law